Kumbhashi or Anegudde is a village in the Kundapura taluk of Udupi district, India. It lies en route from Udupi towards Kundapura on the NH 66. 

One of the best known temples to Ganesha in Udupi district is that of Shri Maha Ganapathi at Kumbhashi. Kumbhashi is one of the seven "Mukti Sthalas" (Parashurama Kshetra) in coastal Karnataka.

References

External links 
Anegudde Shri Vinayaka Temple
Anegudde Vinayaka Temple
 Anegudde vinayaka
 Reference to the Mukti Sthalas 
 Official website : anegudde.in

Villages in Udupi district